Country Code: +226
International Call Prefix: 00
Trunk Prefix:

Calling formats
 AB PQ MC DU - Calls within Burkina Faso
 +226 AB PQ MC DU - Calls from outside Burkina Faso
The NSN length is eight digits.

Changes since 2004

Changes in 2004

There is no record of what the old mobile number allocations were, or how these map to the new number ranges.

List of area codes in Burkina Faso

References

Burkina Faso
Telecommunications in Burkina Faso
Telephone numbers